Never Hungover Again is the third studio album by American punk rock band Joyce Manor, released on 22 July 2014 through Epitaph Records. The album cover features Matt Ebert with Frances Quinlan from the band Hop Along.

Critical reception

Upon its release, Never Hungover Again received positive reviews from music critics. At Metacritic, which assigns a normalized rating out of 100 to reviews from critics, the album received an average score of 82, which indicates "universal acclaim", based on 13 reviews. The A.V. Club critic David Anthony wrote that the album "isn’t a complete overhaul of the band’s sound, but with all the gentle twists on those charms, it ends up serving as a re-introduction." AllMusic's Tim Sendra stated: "Joyce Manor make 20 minutes feel way more epic than the running time might promise, and Never Hungover Again ends up as the kind of record that feels like an instant classic." Ian Cohen of Pitchfork thought: "Once you stop trying to label what should be a hook and focus on what is, the ingenuity of each song’s design and the ear-turning nature of every maneuver speaks to Never Hungover Agains inexhaustible quality, the kind of album you can play three times in a row without any part wearing out its welcome." Pitchfork went on to rank the album 90 in its list of the 200 best albums of the 2010s.

Track listing

Personnel
Joyce Manor
 Barry Johnson - vocals, guitar
 Matt Ebert - bass, vocals
 Chase Knobbe - guitar
 Kurt Walcher - drums

Other personnel
 Joe Reinhart - production, engineering
 Scott Arnold - design and layout
 Howie Weinberg - mastering
 Tony Hoffer - mixing
 Ariel LeBeau - photography, backing vocals 
 Evan Bernard - assistant production, assistant engineering
 Alex Estrada - production (vocals)
 Brett Gurewitz - production (vocals) 
 Terence Calacsan - keyboards
 Peter Helms - backing vocals

Chart positions

References

External links
 

2014 albums
Epitaph Records albums
Joyce Manor albums